The men's combined event at the 2020 Summer Olympics was a climbing competition combining three disciplines (speed, bouldering, lead). It was held from August 3 to August 5, 2021 at the Aomi Urban Sports Park in Tokyo. A total of 20 athletes from 15 nations competed. Sport climbing was one of four new sports added to the Olympic program for 2020.

During the qualifying round, Bassa Mawem of France suffered an injury to his lower bicep tendon in his left arm and was forced to withdraw from the final.

Qualification

Competition format
In the qualification round each of the twenty competitors competed in speed climbing, bouldering and lead climbing. 
The scores were multiplied and the 8 competitors with the lowest total scores proceeded to the finals.

In speed climbing, climbers raced against each others in pairs on a standardized wall of 15m in height. In the qualification round, climbers had two runs on two different lanes; their best times were recorded and used for seeding placement in the Final rounds. In the final round, climbers raced head-to-head with the fastest to the top winning.

In bouldering, climbers needed to top boulder problems set on 4.5m-high wall within a certain amount of time. In the qualification round, climbers were faced with 4 boulder problems and given 5 minutes on each problem to top them. The final round had 3 boulder problems to top within a 4 minutes time limit.

In lead climbing, climbers were given a route set on 15m-high wall to top within 6 minutes. If there was a tie, the climber with the fastest elapsed time won.

Route-setting 
Speed climbing wall is standardized: 15 meters tall, 5 degrees overhanging. Bouldering and lead climbing have route-setting teams.

The bouldering route-setters were Percy Bishton (chief) from the United Kingdom, Manuel Hassler from Switzerland, Romain Cabessut from France and Garrett Gregor from the United States.

The lead route-setters were Adam Pustelnik (chief) from Poland, Jan Zbranek from Czech Republic, Hiroshi Okano and Akito Matsushima from Japan.

Records
Prior to this competition, the existing world and Olympic records were as follows.

The following records were established during the competition:

Schedule
All times are Japan Standard Time (UTC+9)

Results

Qualification 
The top 8 climbers of 20 advanced to the Finals.

Final 

* Injured and could not compete.

References

Men's events at the 2020 Summer Olympics
Men's